

England

Head coach: Andy Robinson

 Stuart Abbott
 Steve Borthwick
 George Chuter
 Ben Cohen
 Martin Corry (c.)
 Mark Cueto
 Lawrence Dallaglio
 Matt Dawson
 Harry Ellis
 Perry Freshwater
 Andy Goode
 Danny Grewcock
 Charlie Hodgson
 Josh Lewsey
 Lee Mears
 Lewis Moody
 Jamie Noon
 Simon Shaw
 Andrew Sheridan
 James Simpson-Daniel
 Matt Stevens
 Steve Thompson
 Mike Tindall
 Tom Voyce
 David Walder
 Julian White
 Joe Worsley

France

Head coach: Bernard Laporte

 Julien Bonnaire
 Guillaume Bousses
 Benjamin Boyet
 Sébastien Bruno
 Nicolas Brusque
 Thomas Castaignède
 Pieter de Villiers
 Christophe Dominici
 Jean-Baptiste Élissalde
 Florian Fritz
 Cédric Heymans
 Raphaël Ibañez
 Thomas Lièvremont
 Olivier Magne
 Sylvain Marconnet
 Rémy Martin
 David Marty
 Frédéric Michalak
 Olivier Milloud
 Lionel Nallet
 Yannick Nyanga
 Fabien Pelous (c.)
 Aurélien Rougerie
 Dimitri Szarzewski
 Jérôme Thion
 Damien Traille
 Ludovic Valbon
 Dimitri Yachvili
    Carlos Nieto

Ireland

Head coach: Eddie O'Sullivan

 Rory Best
 Simon Best
 Tommy Bowe
 Reggie Corrigan
 Gordon D'Arcy
 Girvan Dempsey
 Simon Easterby
 Jerry Flannery
 John Hayes
 Marcus Horan
 Shane Horgan
 David Humphreys
 Denis Leamy
 Geordan Murphy
 Donncha O'Callaghan
 Paul O'Connell
 Jonny O'Connor
 Brian O'Driscoll (c.)
 Mick O'Driscoll
 Ronan O'Gara
 Malcolm O'Kelly
 Eoin Reddan
 Peter Stringer
 Andrew Trimble
 David Wallace

Italy

Head coach:  Pierre Berbizier

 Mauro Bergamasco
 Mirco Bergamasco
 Valerio Bernabò
 Marco Bortolami (c.)
 Gonzalo Canale
 Pablo Canavosio
 Martin Castrogiovanni
 Carlo Del Fava
 Santiago Dellapè
 Carlo Festuccia
 Ezio Galon
 Paul Griffen
 Andrea Lo Cicero
 Carlos Nieto
 Ludovico Nitoglia
 Fabio Ongaro
 Sergio Parisse
 Aaron Persico
 Salvatore Perugini
 Ramiro Pez
 Simon Picone
 Josh Sole
 Cristian Stoica
 Rima Wakarua
 Maurizio Zaffiri
 Alessandro Zanni

Scotland

Head coach: Frank Hadden

 Mike Blair
 Chris Cusiter
 Marcus Di Rollo
 Bruce Douglas
 Ross Ford
 Dougie Hall
 Andrew Henderson
 Nathan Hines
 Allister Hogg
 Alastair Kellock
 Gavin Kerr
 Sean Lamont
 Scott Lawson
 Ben MacDougall
 Scott MacLeod
 Scott Murray
 Dan Parks
 Chris Paterson
 John Petrie
 Gordon Ross
 Craig Smith
 Hugo Southwell
 Simon Taylor
 Simon Webster
 Jason White (c.)

Wales

Head coach: Mike Ruddock (resigned) / Scott Johnson

 Lee Byrne
 Colin Charvis
 Gareth Cooper
 Barry Davies
 Mefin Davies
 Gareth Delve
 Ian Gough
 Gavin Henson
 Dafydd James
 Gethin Jenkins
 Adam M. Jones
 Adam R. Jones
 Dafydd Jones
 Duncan Jones
 Mark Jones
 Stephen Jones
 Hal Luscombe
 Michael Owen (c.)**
 Dwayne Peel
 Mike Phillips
 Alix Popham
 Nicky Robinson
 Robert Sidoli
 Ceri Sweeney
 Gareth Thomas (c.)*
 Jonathan Thomas
 T Rhys Thomas
 Matthew Watkins
 Andy Williams
 Martyn Williams
 Shane Williams

*captain in the first two games
**captain in the third, fourth and fifth games

Notes and references
RBS Six Nations Squads

2006
2006 Six Nations Championship